Piruna aea, the many-spotted skipperling, is a species of intermediate skipper in the butterfly family Hesperiidae. It is found in Central America and North America.

The MONA or Hodges number for Piruna aea is 3986.1.

Subspecies
These two subspecies belong to the species Piruna aea:
 Piruna aea aea
 Piruna aea mexicana H. Freeman, 1979

References

Further reading

 

Heteropterinae
Articles created by Qbugbot